Low Thia Khiang (born 5 September 1956) is a Singaporean former politician who served as Secretary-General of the Workers' Party (WP) between 2001 and 2018. He was the Member of Parliament (MP) for Hougang SMC between 1991 and 2011 and Aljunied GRC representing Bedok Reservoir — Punggol between 2011 and 2020. He was one of the two opposition MPs in Parliament.

Low made his political debut in the 1991 general election where he contested in Hougang SMC as a WP candidate. He was appointed Secretary-General of the Workers' Party on 27 May 2001.

During the 2011 general election, Low decided not to seek re-election in Hougang SMC and instead contested in Aljunied GRC and led the party into a historic breakthrough when his team won the first group representation constituency (GRC) from the governing People's Action Party (PAP). Low became one of five elected opposition MPs for Aljunied GRC in the 13th Parliament and represented the Bedok Reservoir–Punggol division between 2011 and 2020.  He was the de facto Leader of the Opposition between 2006 and 2018. 

As part of a leadership renewal, Low was succeeded by Pritam Singh as Secretary-General in 2018, and also stepped down as the MP for Aljunied GRC prior to the 2020 general election, making him Singapore's longest-serving opposition Member of Parliament with 29 years in service. He has indicated his desire to remain active in politics.

Early life
Low studied at Lik Teck Primary School and Chung Cheng High School before he attended Nanyang University, where he majored in Chinese language and literature, and government and public administration. In 1981, he completed a Bachelor of Arts (Honours) in Chinese studies at the National University of Singapore. In 1982, he completed a diploma in education. He worked as a teacher for a few years before starting his own business.

Political career
Low joined the Workers' Party (WP) in 1982, and was subsequently appointed as its Organising Secretary. At the 1984 general election, he was the election agent for the party's secretary-general, J. B. Jeyaretnam, in his successful campaign to win Anson constituency.

Low is well known for giving speeches in Teochew, which have won him much support from a large number of Teochew-speaking residents in Hougang SMC.

In the 2016 Workers' Party Central Executive Committee (CEC) elections, Low's position of secretary-general was contended by fellow Aljunied MP Chen Show Mao. This was the first time Low was challenged for the post since he took it up in 2001. Low retained his seat with 61 votes, to Chen's 45. Chen remains in the CEC as a member.

Low announced at his party's 60th anniversary dinner that he would not be contesting for the post of secretary-general for the 2018 party elections and would step down to renew leadership in WP after being at its helm for 17 years. Low formally stepped down as WP chief on 8 April 2018. Chan Chun Sing, the Minister for Trade and Industry, subsequently praised Low at a Parliament sitting on 15 May 2018 for the role he played in Parliament, acknowledging him as "a fellow Singaporean and very much part of Team Singapore", and that while the PAP may not always agree with Low's perspectives or methods, the PAP nevertheless appreciate(d) his efforts to work together to build a better Singapore.

1988 General Election
In 1988, Low represented the WP in a televised debate with the PAP government on proposals to create an elected Presidency for Singapore, during which he engaged Ong Teng Cheong and Lee Hsien Loong, who later became the President and Prime Minister of Singapore respectively. In the general election later that year, Low, together with Gopalan Nair and Lim Lye Soon, contested Tiong Bahru Group Representation Constituency (GRC) against only the PAP and won 42.2% of the vote.

1991 General Election
In 1991, Low, as the Workers' Party's assistant secretary-general, won the single-member constituency (SMC) of Hougang in the 1991 general election and entered Parliament. In 1992, Low was appointed by Prime Minister Goh Chok Tong as a member of the Cost Review Committee. After a year of intensive study, Low decided to produce his own independent report as he had a different perspective from the other members of the committee.

1997 General Election
Low was re-elected as the MP for Hougang SMC at the 1997 general election, his second election victory in Hougang.

2001 General Election
On 27 May 2001, Low became the secretary-general of the Workers' Party, replacing J. B. Jeyaretnam. He was re-elected again as the MP for Hougang at the 2001 general election.

2006 General Election
At the 2006 general elections, Low won his fourth straight term for the Hougang constituency. He received 13,987 of the votes cast, a 62.74 per cent victory margin which was an increase of 7.74% from the last general election in November 2001. His opponent from the People's Action Party, Eric Low, received 8,306 votes.

2011 General Election
Between 1997 and 2011, Low and Chiam See Tong were the only elected opposition Members of Parliament (MP) in Parliament.

During the 2011 general election, Low and Chiam left their respective strongholds in Hougang and Potong Pasir SMC to challenge the ruling PAP in Group Representation Constituencies (GRCs). Low would challenge the ruling PAP in Aljunied GRC, while Chiam would contest the Bishan–Toa Payoh GRC. In so doing, Low and Chiam risked a situation where there would be no elected opposition MPs in Parliament had they lost.

Low's gambit paid off as he led the Workers' Party to a historic breakthrough in the election, with a victory in Aljunied GRC but Chiam lost in Bishan–Toa Payoh GRC.  The win marked the first time that an opposition party won a GRC. As a result of the victory, the Workers' Party had a total of six elected MPs in Parliament, including the seat in Hougang SMC (which was retained by Low's party member, Yaw Shin Leong).

2015 General Election
At the 2015 general election, Low and his team won and retained their seats in Aljunied GRC. However, the team's votes share decreased to 50.96%, a drop of 3.76%, with a narrow margin of 1.9% (2,626 votes). As the margin was within the 2% range, there was a recount. This was Low's sixth continuous win as an elected opposition MP (four in Hougang SMC and two in Aljunied GRC). He is one of few elected opposition MPs to successfully defend a GRC as an incumbent; he also tied with Chiam for electing the most number of times for an opposition candidate, with six terms.

2020: Post-political career
On 30 April 2020, Low was hospitalised at an intensive care unit in Khoo Teck Puat Hospital as a result of a head injury. While still recuperating, Workers' Party announced that Low, along with Chen Show Mao and Png Eng Huat would not contest in the 2020 Singaporean general election in a move to "broaden its leadership base and also remain in touch with the ground as Singapore's population changes".

In interviews following the decision not to contest, Low stated that it is unlikely he would make a political comeback in the future. Low felt that he had achieved his goals of securing a group representation constituency, which he did with the 2011 Singaporean general election, and to renew the party leadership. Pritam Singh succeeded Low as the secretary-general.  Low would remain involved with the party in a mentoring role, advising the present leadership when asked.

Personal life
Low first met Han Mui Keow while they were students at Chung Cheng High School in 1973. They were married in 1982 and had two sons and a daughter. He is a Buddhist.

On 30 April 2020, Low was hospitalised at an intensive care unit in Khoo Teck Puat Hospital as a result of a head injury. On 4 May, Low was transferred to the general ward, and remained until he was discharged on 21 May. The fall affected his olfactory nerve centre, robbing him his sense of smell. He was discharged on 21 May.

References

|-

Members of the Parliament of Singapore
National University of Singapore alumni
Nanyang University alumni
Singaporean people of Teochew descent
1956 births
Living people
Workers' Party (Singapore) politicians
Singaporean Buddhists
Singaporean educators
Singaporean businesspeople
21st-century Singaporean businesspeople
20th-century Singaporean businesspeople